Ramachandra Rao is an Indian given name:

 S. K. Ramachandra Rao (1925–2006),  Indian author, Sanskrit scholar, and professor of psychology.
 K. V. P. Ramachandra Rao (born 1948),  Member of Parliament in India.
 Tagadur Ramachandra Rao (1898–1980s),  veteran freedom fighter and social activist from Karnataka
 Goparaju Ramachandra Rao (1902–1975),  Indian social reformer, atheist activist and a participant in the Indian independence movement
 Ogirala Ramachandra Rao (1905–1957),  Indian film actor, music director
 R. Ramachandra Rao (1871–1936),  Indian civil servant, mathematician and social and political activist.
 Udupi Ramachandra Rao (1932–2017), popularly known as U. R. Rao is a space scientist.
 Gattu Ramachandra Rao,  Indian politician
 C. Ramachandra Rao (born 1931),  Telugu Short Story writer
 T. Ramachandra Rao (1825–1879),  Indian civil servant.
 Patcha Ramachandra Rao (1942–2010),  metallurgist and administrator
 Ramachandra Vitthala Rao (1850–1892)
 Yelsetti Ramachandra Rao  (1885–1972), Indian entomologist

Indian given names
Telugu given names